Jason DeLucia (born July 24, 1969) is an American retired mixed martial artist.

Biography
DeLucia practiced the Five Animals style of Kung Fu, Taekwondo, Aikido, Karate, and Judo. He is remembered by UFC enthusiasts for being in the very first fight (and the very first win) in UFC history. At UFC 2: No Way Out, DeLucia fought Royce Gracie and lost via armbar submission. After DeLucia tapped out, Gracie did not let go of the armbar and the commentator claimed his elbow had popped ("popped a capsule"). However, DeLucia denied this in a Sherdog.com forum, saying it was just badly bent. DeLucia infamously once suffered a ruptured liver against MMA legend Bas Rutten at Pancrase: Truth 6 on June 25, 1996.

Trivia
Several years before they fought in UFC 2, DeLucia and Gracie went up against each other in a “Gracie Challenge” match at Royce’s brother Rorion Gracie’s jiu-jitsu school. The match can be seen on Youtube and in the “Gracie in Action 2” DVD.

Championships and Accomplishments
Pancrase Hybrid Wrestling
1996 King of Pancrase Championship Tournament Runner-Up
Ultimate Fighting Championship
Fought the first fight in UFC History

Mixed martial arts record

|-
| Loss
| align=center| 33–21–1
| Lance Everson
| TKO
| WFL: Calloway Cup 4
| 
| align=center| 1
| align=center| N/A
| Revere, Massachusetts, United States
| 
|-
| Loss
| align=center| 33–20–1
| Fabio Piamonte
| Submission (triangle/armbar)
| Cage Rage 15
| 
| align=center| 1
| align=center| 1:04
| London, England
| 
|-
| Win
| align=center| 33–19–1
| Matt Rogers
| Submission (rear naked choke)
| SB 1: Shootbox 1
| 
| align=center| 1
| align=center| 2:39
| Orlando, Florida, United States
| 
|-
| Loss
| align=center| 32–19–1
| Katsuhisa Fujii
| TKO (knee injury)
| Pancrase - 2001 Anniversary Show
| 
| align=center| 1
| align=center| 5:00
| Yokohama, Japan
| 
|-
| Loss
| align=center| 32–18–1
| Yuki Sasaki
| Submission (armbar)
| Pancrase - 2001 Neo-Blood Tournament Opening Round
| 
| align=center| 2
| align=center| 3:05
| Tokyo, Japan
| 
|-
| Loss
| align=center| 32–17–1
| Daisuke Ishii
| Decision (unanimous)
| Pancrase - Proof 4
| 
| align=center| 3
| align=center| 5:00
| Tokyo, Japan
| 
|-
| Draw
| align=center| 
| Katsuhisa Fujii
| Draw
| Pancrase - Trans 7
| 
| align=center| 1
| align=center| 15:00
| Tokyo, Japan
| 
|-
| Win
| align=center| 32–16
| Takaichi Hirayama
| Decision (unanimous)
| Pancrase - Trans 6
| 
| align=center| 1
| align=center| 10:00
| Tokyo, Japan
| 
|-
| Loss
| align=center| 31–16
| Omar Bouiche
| Submission (armbar)
| Pancrase - Trans 4
| 
| align=center| 1
| align=center| 2:18
| Tokyo, Japan
| 
|-
| Loss
| align=center| 31–15
| Bob Stines
| TKO (strikes)
| Pancrase - Trans 3
| 
| align=center| 1
| align=center| 0:32
| Yokohama, Japan
| 
|-
| Loss
| align=center| 31–14
| Joe Slick
| TKO (injury)
| UFC 23
| 
| align=center| 1
| align=center| 1:12
| Tokyo, Japan
| 
|-
| Win
| align=center| 31–13
| Manabu Yamada
| Decision (unanimous)
| Pancrase - 1999 Neo-Blood Tournament Second Round
| 
| align=center| 1
| align=center| 15:00
| Tokyo, Japan
| 
|-
| Win
| align=center| 30–13
| Chris Lytle
| Decision (majority)
| Pancrase - Breakthrough 7
| 
| align=center| 1
| align=center| 10:00
| Tokyo, Japan
| 
|-
| Win
| align=center| 29–13
| Ikuhisa Minowa
| Decision (unanimous)
| Pancrase - Breakthrough 6
| 
| align=center| 1
| align=center| 10:00
| Tokyo, Japan
| 
|-
| Win
| align=center| 28–13
| Ryushi Yanagisawa
| Decision (majority)
| Pancrase - Breakthrough 5
| 
| align=center| 1
| align=center| 15:00
| Nagoya, Japan
| 
|-
| Win
| align=center| 27–13
| Kiuma Kunioku
| Decision (lost points)
| Pancrase - Breakthrough 1
| 
| align=center| 1
| align=center| 15:00
| Tokyo, Japan
| 
|-
| Win
| align=center| 26–13
| Manabu Yamada
| Submission (armbar)
| Pancrase: Advance 12
| 
| align=center| 1
| align=center| 1:13
| Chiba, Japan
| 
|-
| Loss
| align=center| 25–13
| Keiichiro Yamamiya
| Decision (lost points)
| Pancrase: Advance 10
| 
| align=center| 1
| align=center| 15:00
| Tokyo, Japan
| 
|-
| Win
| align=center| 25–12
| Satoshi Hasegawa
| Decision (majority)
| Pancrase: 1998 Anniversary Show
| 
| align=center| 1
| align=center| 10:00
| Tokyo, Japan
| 
|-
| Win
| align=center| 24–12
| Satoshi Hasegawa
| TKO (armlock)
| Pancrase: Advance 7
| 
| align=center| 1
| align=center| 6:14
| Tokyo, Japan
| 
|-
| Loss
| align=center| 23–12
| Ryushi Yanagisawa
| Submission (toe hold)
| Pancrase: Advance 5
| 
| align=center| 1
| align=center| 12:44
| Yokohama, Japan
| 
|-
| Win
| align=center| 23–11
| Satoshi Hasegawa
| TKO (doctor)
| Pancrase: Advance 3
| 
| align=center| 1
| align=center| 0:55
| Kobe, Japan
| 
|-
| Win
| align=center| 22–11
| Takafumi Ito
| Decision (lost points)
| Pancrase: Advance 1
| 
| align=center| 1
| align=center| 10:00
| Tokyo, Japan
| 
|-
| Win
| align=center| 21–11
| Ikuhisa Minowa
| Submission (choke)
| Pancrase: Alive 11
| 
| align=center| 1
| align=center| 3:47
| Yokohama, Japan
| 
|-
| Loss
| align=center| 20–11
| Yuki Kondo
| Submission (toe hold)
| Pancrase: 1997 Anniversary Show
| 
| align=center| 1
| align=center| 27:22
| Chiba, Japan
| 
|-
| Win
| align=center| 20–10
| Kiuma Kunioku
| TKO (cut)
| Pancrase: Alive 6
| 
| align=center| 1
| align=center| 18:51
| Tokyo, Japan
| 
|-
| Win
| align=center| 19–10
| Kazuo Takahashi
| Submission (armbar)
| Pancrase: Alive 5
| 
| align=center| 1
| align=center| 5:13
| Kobe, Japan
| 
|-
| Win
| align=center| 18–10
| Takafumi Ito
| Submission
| Pancrase: Alive 4
| 
| align=center| 1
| align=center| 4:54
| Chiba, Japan
| 
|-
| Loss
| align=center| 17–10
| Masakatsu Funaki
| TKO
| Pancrase - Truth 10
| 
| align=center| 1
| align=center| 7:49
| Tokyo, Japan
| 
|-
| Win
| align=center| 17–9
| Osami Shibuya
| Submission
| Pancrase - Truth 9
| 
| align=center| 1
| align=center| 11:45
| Kobe, Japan
| 
|-
| Win
| align=center| 16–9
| Yuki Kondo
| Decision (lost points)
| Pancrase - Truth 7
| 
| align=center| 1
| align=center| 20:00
| Nagoya, Japan
| 
|-
| Win
| align=center| 15–9
| Minoru Suzuki
| KO (palm strike)
| Pancrase - 1996 Anniversary Show
| 
| align=center| 1
| align=center| 4:58
| Chiba, Japan
| 
|-
| Loss
| align=center| 14–9
| Bas Rutten
| TKO (liver shot)
| Pancrase - Truth 6
| 
| align=center| 1
| align=center| 4:56
| Fukuoka, Japan
| 
|-
| Win
| align=center| 14–8
| Osami Shibuya
| Decision (lost points)
| Pancrase - Truth 5
| 
| align=center| 1
| align=center| 15:00
| Tokyo, Japan
| 
|-
| Win
| align=center| 13–8
| Kiuma Kunioku
| Decision (lost points)
| Pancrase - Truth 4
| 
| align=center| 1
| align=center| 15:00
| Tokyo, Japan
| 
|-
| Win
| align=center| 12–8
| Kazuo Takahashi
| KO
| Pancrase - Truth 2
| 
| align=center| 1
| align=center| 3:37
| Kobe, Japan
| 
|-
| Win
| align=center| 11–8
| Katsuomi Inagaki
| Submission (choke)
| Pancrase - Truth 1
| 
| align=center| 1
| align=center| 4:56
| Yokohama, Japan
| 
|-
| Win
| align=center| 10–8
| Takafumi Ito
| Submission
| Pancrase - Eyes Of Beast 7
| 
| align=center| 1
| align=center| 3:49
| Sapporo, Japan
| 
|-
| Win
| align=center| 9–8
| Takaku Fuke
| Decision (lost points)
| Pancrase - Eyes Of Beast 6
| 
| align=center| 1
| align=center| 30:00
| Yokohama, Japan
| 
|-
| Win
| align=center| 8–8
| Ryushi Yanagisawa
| Submission (triangle choke)
| Pancrase - 1995 Anniversary Show
| 
| align=center| 1
| align=center| 2:25
| Tokyo, Japan
| 
|-
| Loss
| align=center| 7–8
| Minoru Suzuki
| Submission (guillotine choke)
| Pancrase - 1995 Neo-Blood Tournament Opening Round
| 
| align=center| 1
| align=center| 9:23
| Tokyo, Japan
| 
|-
| Loss
| align=center| 7–7
| Bas Rutten
| Submission (toe hold)
| Pancrase - Eyes Of Beast 5
| 
| align=center| 1
| align=center| 1:32
| Sapporo, Japan
| 
|-
| Loss
| align=center| 7–6
| Manabu Yamada
| Submission (heelhook)
| Pancrase - Eyes Of Beast 4
| 
| align=center| 1
| align=center| 3:03
| Chiba, Japan
| 
|-
| Win
| align=center| 7–5
| John Renfroe
| Submission
| Pancrase - Eyes Of Beast 3
| 
| align=center| 1
| align=center| 1:36
| Nagoya, Japan
| 
|-
| Win
| align=center| 6–5
| Manabu Yamada
| TKO
| Pancrase - Eyes Of Beast 2
| 
| align=center| 1
| align=center| 1:41
| Nagoya, Japan
| 
|-
| Loss
| align=center| 5–5
| Masakatsu Funaki
| Submission (heelhook)
| Pancrase - Eyes Of Beast 1
| 
| align=center| 1
| align=center| 9:04
| Nagoya, Japan
| 
|-
| Loss
| align=center| 5–4
| Minoru Suzuki
| Submission
| Pancrase: King of Pancrase Tournament Opening Round
| 
| align=center| 1
| align=center| 2:04
| Tokyo, Japan
| 
|-
| Win
| align=center| 5–3
| Thomas Puckett
| KO
| Pancrase: King of Pancrase Tournament Opening Round
| 
| align=center| 1
| align=center| 0:48
| Tokyo, Japan
| 
|-
| Loss
| align=center| 4–3
| Bas Rutten
| Submission (guillotine choke)
| Pancrase - Road To The Championship 5
| 
| align=center| 1
| align=center| 1:43
| Tokyo, Japan
| 
|-
| Win
| align=center| 4–2
| Matt Hume
| Decision (lost points)
| Pancrase - Road To The Championship 4
| 
| align=center| 1
| align=center| 15:00
| Osaka, Japan
| 
|-
| Loss
| align=center| 3–2
| Takaku Fuke
| Submission  (heel hook)
| Pancrase - Road To The Championship 3
| 
| align=center| 1
| align=center| 4:00
| Tokyo, Japan
| 
|-
| Win
| align=center| 3–1
| Masakatsu Funaki
| Submission (kneebar)
| Pancrase - Road To The Championship 2
| 
| align=center| 1
| align=center| 1:01
| Amagasaki, Hyogo, Japan
| 
|-
| Loss
| align=center| 2–1
| Royce Gracie
| Submission (armlock)
| UFC 2
| 
| align=center| 1
| align=center| 1:07
| Denver, Colorado, United States
| 
|-
| Win
| align=center| 2–0
| Scott Baker
| Submission (strikes)
| UFC 2
| 
| align=center| 1
| align=center| 6:41
| Denver, Colorado, United States
| 
|-
| Win
| align=center| 1–0
| Trent Jenkins
| Submission (rear naked choke)
| UFC 1
| 
| align=center| 1
| align=center| 0:52
| Denver, Colorado, United States
|

Kickboxing record 

|-
|
|Loss
| Sergei Gur
|Seikendo: SWA Ultimate Boxing
|Tokyo, Japan
|TKO (punch)
|align="center"|2
|align="center"|12:57
|0-1
|-
| colspan=9 | Legend:

Submission grappling record 
KO PUNCHES
|- style="text-align:center; background:#f0f0f0;"
| style="border-style:none none solid solid; "|Result
| style="border-style:none none solid solid; "|Opponent
| style="border-style:none none solid solid; "|Method
| style="border-style:none none solid solid; "|Event
| style="border-style:none none solid solid; "|Date
| style="border-style:none none solid solid; "|Round
| style="border-style:none none solid solid; "|Time
| style="border-style:none none solid solid; "|Notes
|-
|Win || Minoru Suzuki || Submission (triangle choke) || Pancrase: Proof 1 || || 1|| 2:49||
|-

References

External links

1969 births
American male mixed martial artists
American wushu practitioners
Living people
Mixed martial artists from Massachusetts
Light heavyweight mixed martial artists
Mixed martial artists utilizing karate
Mixed martial artists utilizing wushu
Mixed martial artists utilizing taekwondo
Mixed martial artists utilizing aikido
Mixed martial artists utilizing judo
People from Bellingham, Massachusetts
Ultimate Fighting Championship male fighters